The Yidinyic languages are a pair of languages, previously classified as Paman, proposed to form a separate branch of the Pama–Nyungan family. They are:
Djabugay
Yidiny
However, Bowern (2011) only separates out Yidiny itself, leaving Djabugay in Paman.

References